Back 2 Love is an album by Pakistani Qawwali singer Ustad Rahat Fateh Ali Khan. The album was released globally on 9 June 2014. Back 2 Love is a collection of 10 songs including collaborations with Indian musicians and singers like Salim–Sulaiman and Shreya Ghoshal.

Music video(s)
The lyrics for the song "Zaroori Tha" are written by Khalil-ur-Rehman Qamar and it is composed by Sahir Ali Bagga. Its music video has been directed by Rahul Sud, and it features the Bigg Boss 7 couple Gauahar Khan and Kushal Tandon. It was released on 8 June 2014. It became the first Pakistani origin non-film YouTube India/Vevo music video to cross 100 million views after two years, 200 million views within three years of its release, 300 million views on 12 December 2017, 400 million views on 2 June 2018, 500 million views on 11 October 2018, and then a billion views on 3 January 2021.

The song was also featured in Mohit Suri's 2015 film Hamari Adhuri Kahani, starring Emraan Hashmi and Vidya Balan.

Track listing
The full track list was announced at iTunes on 7 May 2014. The song Rab Jaane was awarded as the "Indi Pop Song of the Year" at 7th Mirchi Music Awards.

See also
 Sahir Ali Bagga
 Rahat Fateh Ali Khan

References

External links

2014 albums
Rahat Fateh Ali Khan albums